Maria Sophia Campo Atayde (born March 23, 1992), known professionally as Ria Atayde, is a Filipino actress. She is the daughter of veteran actress Sylvia Sanchez and businessman Art Atayde. Her professional career began with the drama series Ningning and variety show It's Showtime.

Early life
Atayde was born and raised in the Philippines. She is the daughter of Sylvia Sanchez, a veteran actress, and Art Atayde, a businessman. She has three siblings: Arjo, Gela, and Xavi. She is an alumna of Saint Pedro Poveda College and De La Salle University, where she took up Communication Arts for bachelors and graduated from in June 2014.

Career
Her career began in 2015 when she starred in ABS-CBN's Ningning (2015–16). The series was aired on the Prime Tanghali noontime show slot. Atayde played a minor role in this series as Teacher Hope, Ningning's teacher. She starred opposite of Jana Cassandra Agoncillo, Beauty Gonzalez and her mother, Sylvia Sanchez. The series aired its final episode on January 15, 2016, and concluded with a total of 125 episodes.

After her successful portrayal in Ningning, Atayde joined It's Showtime and became part of the cast during its Lenten Special week. Atayde was in the series during an episode entitled "The Wedding" and played the role of "Sheila". Shortly after, she was cast in the long running drama anthology series Maalaala Mo Kaya (2016) for the episode entitled "Puno ng Mangga". She received the award for Best Female New TV Personality for this role. Atayde then starred in an episode of Ipaglaban Mo! (2016). She then went to Wansapanataym (2016) to star in the miniseries Holly and Mau, after playing several roles of heavy drama.

After a short break, Atayde was cast in the popular fantasy television series My Dear Heart (2017), opposite Nayomi "Heart" Ramos, Coney Reyes, Zanjoe Marudo and Bela Padilla. The series received a great response and garnered 31.0% on its 2nd episode nationwide according to Kantar Media ratings. Portraying the role of Gia Divinagracia, this is Atayde's most recent dramatic return to teleseryes. The series premiered on January 23, 2017 on ABS-CBN's Primetime Bida evening block.

In 2020, she became one of the hosts of Chika, Besh! along with fellow actresses, Pauleen Luna and comedienne Pokwang, aired on TV5 through a blocktime agreement, but is still under contract with Star Magic.

Filmography

Films

Television

Awards

 2016 PMPC Star Awards for TV's "Best Female New TV Personality" for MMK episode: Puno ng Mangga.
 2016 PMPC Star Awards for TV's "Female Star of the Night (Music)"

Discography

Footnotes
Mother is Sylvia Sanchez
Younger Sister of Arjo Atayde
Brief history 
Cousin of Coleen Garcia

References

External links
 

1992 births
Living people
ABS-CBN personalities
TV5 (Philippine TV network) personalities
De La Salle University alumni
Filipino people of American descent
Filipino people of German descent
Filipino people of Scottish descent
Filipino people of Spanish descent
Filipino television actresses
People from Mandaluyong
Star Magic